Mikhail Mikhailovich Kozakov (in Russian: Михаил Михайлович Козаков) (14 October 1934, Leningrad – 22 April 2011, Ramat Gan) was a Soviet, Russian and Israeli film and theatre director and actor.

Biography

Early life
Mikhail Kozakov was born on 14 October 1934 in Leningrad, the youngest of three brothers. His father Mikhail Emmanuilovich Kozakov was a Soviet writer and playwright of Jewish origin originally from the Poltava Governorate who served as a commissar in Lubny during the Russian Civil War, then worked as a journalist in Leningrad. He was among the authors who collaborated on The I.V. Stalin White Sea – Baltic Sea Canal.

Kozakov's mother Zoya Alexandrovna Nikitina (née Gatskevich) was of mixed Serbian-Greek descent. Her family moved from Odessa to St. Petersburg. She finished the Karl May School and worked as an editor in publishing houses, the Leningrad Literature Fund (Litfund) and various magazines. This was her fourth marriage. She was arrested twice: first in 1937 following the arrest of her brother who served in the Imperial Russian Army during the civil war (he was sentenced to death while she spent a year in prison), then — in 1948 because of financial violations in Litfund (released in 1950). She was friends with many acclaimed writers who visited Kozakovs' apartment on the Griboyedov Canal, including Evgeny Schwartz, Mikhail Zoshchenko, Anatoly Marienhof, Boris Eikhenbaum, Anna Akhmatova.

During the war Kozakov was evacuated to the Molotov Oblast along with other Leningrad children where he lived from 1941 to 1944. He then returned to the city and continued the secondary education. His brother Vladimir volunteered for the frontline and was killed in 1945. His second brother Boris was accidentally shot in 1946 in his flat by his classmate.

Theatre
In 1956, Mikhail Kozakov graduated from the Moscow Art Theatre School. In the summer of this year the picture by Mikhail Romm Murder on Dante Street was released, in which Kozakov acted, and in the autumn of that year he received the role of Hamlet in the performance at the Mayakovsky Theatre.

From 1956 to 1959 Kozakov was an actor of the Mayakovsky Theatre.

From 1959 to 1970 he was an actor of the Sovremennik Theatre.

In the 1960s, Kozakov played several vivid roles, such as Cyrano de Bergerac (Cyrano de Bergerac of Rostand, director Efremov, 1964) in the play of the Sovremennik Theater; chamberlain from Schwarz's fairy tale "The Naked King" - a performance that in 1960 brought the theater a triumph, and then turned into a legend; Kistochkin in the comedy Aksenova "Always on sale" (director O. Efremov, 1965).

On the stage of Sovremennik, Kozakov performed several more roles in the productions of Galina Volchek: Aduyev the elder in Ordinary History I. Goncharov (1966, State Prize of the USSR); Jerry Raiin in "Two on the swing" by W. Ibsen; The actor in M. Gorky's play "The Lower Depths"; Nicholas I in the "Decembrists" by L. Zorin (director O. Efremov); Master Zhivko in the "Masters" R. Stoyanov (Bulgarian director V. Tsankov), etc.

In 1970, the actor left the Sovremennik. A year after he left the theater and its founder - Oleg Efremov. Following Efremov, Kozakov came to the Moscow Art Theater. There they were played by Lord Goring in "Ideal husband" Wilde (director Stanitsyn), Gusev in the play "Valentine and Valentina" Roshchina (director Efremov).

In the Moscow Art Theater, Kozakov began to play Leonid Zorin's play The Copper Grandmother, where Rolan Bykov rehearsed Pushkin's role. The play was closed, and Kozakov went to the Theater on Malaya Bronnaya to Dunayev and Efros. Here the actor performed several more roles: Don Juan (Don Juan by J.-B. Molière, 1973); Kochkarev ("The Marriage" by NV Gogol, 1975); Rakitina ("A Month in the Country" by IS Turgenev, 1978).

There, in Malaya Bronnaya, Kozakov staged two performances: Zorin's comedy The Pokrovsky Gate and O'Neill's play The Soul of the Poet.

In 1986, Kozakov left the Theater on Malaya Bronnaya in Lenk. In 1986, he played the role of Polonius in Panfilov's Hamlet at the Lenkom Theatre, later, in the late 1990s, Shadow of the Father in the same Hamlet by German director Peter Stein.

Film
In 1978, Kozakov made his debut as a film director, with the two-part television film Nameless Star, based on the play of Mikhail Sebastian. Afterwards there were films The Pokrovsky Gate (1982), If We Believe Lopotukhin... (1983), Trustees by A.N. Ostrovsky (1983), Masquerade by M. Lermontov (1985) and others.

During the years of perestroika, Kozakov left Russia. However, after working in the Cameri Theater in Tel Aviv, Israel, as an actor and director (the role of Trigorin in Chekhov's "The Seagull" in Hebrew, staging and playing in "Lover" Harold Pinter, etc.), Mikhail Kozakov chose to return to Russia. In Moscow, he created his own theater called "Russian Entreprise Mikhail Kozakov."

Since 2003, Kozakov was actor of the Mossovet Theatre ("Venetian merchant" - Shylock, "King Lear" - Lear).
The actor read poetry on stage, radio, television, and recorded discs.

In 1999, the actor, together with saxophonist Igor Butman, staged a play-concert on Brodsky's verses "Concert for voice and saxophone".

In 1997, Mikhail Kozakov's "Acting Book" was published, in which he tells about his life, about different times and people of art in them.

Death and personal life
In 2010 Kozakov was diagnosed with lung cancer. He went through unsuccessful treatment in Israel and died on 22 April 2011 in a clinic near Tel Aviv. He was buried at the Vvedenskoye Cemetery in Moscow near his father, in accordance with his will.

Kozakov was officially married five times. He left his last wife Nadezhda Sedova (47 years younger than him) in 2010 with a scandal, claiming that she had stolen his flat and that she was the cause of his illness, and fled to his fourth wife Anna Yampolskaya who lived in Israel along with their children Mikhail and Zoya. He had a daughter Katerina and a son Kirill, also a prominent Russian actor, from his first marriage to Greta Taar, as well as a daughter Manana from his second marriage to Medea Berelashvili.

Honors
Kozakov - People's Artist of Russia (1980), laureate of the State Prizes of the USSR (1967) and the RSFSR (1983), art director of the theater "Russian Entreprise Mikhail Kozakov"

Selected filmography

Actor
 Murder on Dante Street (1956) — Charles Thibault
 Hard Happiness (1958) — Nikolai Nagorny
 The Sisters (1957 film) (1959) —Valerian Onoli
 The Golden Echelon (1959) — Cheremisov
 Far from the Motherland (1960) — Hauptmann Saugel
 Eugenia Grandet (1960) — Charles Grandet
 Last Salvos (1960) — Gorbachev
 Baltic Skies (1960) — Baiseitov, pilot
 Crazy Court (1961) — Michel
 Nine Days in One Year (1962) — Valery Ivanovich
 Amphibian Man (1962) — Pedro Zurita
 The Bridge Is Built (1965) — Mammadov
 A Pistol Shot (1966) — Silvio
 Day of Sun and Rain (1967) — actor as Mishka Japonchik (cameo)
 The Red and The White (1967) — Nestor
 The Tale of the Chekist (1969) — Belov
 Two Days of Miracles (1970) — professor-examiner of the Institute of Good Wizards
 Goya or the Hard Way to Enlightenment (1971) — Gilmarde
 All the King's Men (1971) — Jack Burden
 Grandmaster (1972) — Volodya
 Childhood. Adolescence. Youth (1973) — Pyotr Alexandrovich
 Acting (1973) — Alexander Stern
 The Dombey and the Son (1974) — Sol Giles
 Ivan and Marya (1974) — Cashier
 Lev Gurych Sinichkin (1974) — Zefirov
 The Straw Hat (1974) — Viscount de Rosalba
 Car, Violin and Blot the Dog (1974) — musician playing violin and bass guitar and shashlik vendor
 Hello, I'm Your Aunt! (1975) — Colonel Sir Francis Chesney
 Yaroslav Dombrovsky (1975) — Andrey Vasiliev
 The Theater of an Unknown Actor (1976) — Genrikh Genrikhovich
 The Road to Calvary (1977) — Bessonov
 Nameless Star (1978) — Grig
 The Life of Beethoven (1978) — Gioachino Rossini
 Comedy of Errors (1978) — Anoifall
 A Handsome Man (1978) — Lupachev
 Deficit on Mazaev (1979) — Kira's lover
 The State Border. Peaceful Summer of the 21st Year (1980) — Felix Dzerzhinsky
 Sindicat-2 (1981) — Felix Dzerzhinsky
 December, 20th (1981) — Felix Dzerzhinsky
 And I'm With you Again (1981) — Pyotr Yakovlevich Chaadaev
 Comrade Innokenty (1981) — Sergei Vasilievich Zubatov
 The Sixth (1981) — Illary Danilovich Danilevsky
 Who Is Knocking on the Door? (1982) — Actor playing Cyrano de Bergerac
 The Pokrovsky Gate (1982) — Konstantin Romin 25 years later
 Demidovs (1983) — Biron
 Unicum (1983) — Iosif Timurovich Petrov, hypnotist
 The hero of Her Novel (1984) — Erast Tsykada
 An Incredible Bet, or a True Incident That Ended Successfully a Hundred Years Ago (1984) — Dudnikov, summer resident
 Scenes From the Tragedy “Faust" (1984) — Faust
 Scenes From the Drama "Masquerade" (1985) — Arbenin
 Mister Designer (1988) — Grillio
 And it Happened in Vichy (1989) — doctor
 Fools Die on Fridays (1990) — Geliy Ivanovich
 The Shadow, or Maybe It Will All Come Round (1991) — Caesar Borgia
 Gisele's Mania (1995) — Akim Volynsky
 The Fatal Eggs (1996) — Woland
 Tribute (1999) — Scottie Templeton
 Four Hands Dinner (1999) — Georg Friedrich Handel
 24 Hours (2000 film) (2000) — Costa
 Avalanche (2001) — Lev Borisov
 Game in Modern (2002) — Frieze
 Thieves and Prostitutes. The Prize is Space Flight (2004) — photographer
 The Death of Tairov (2004) — Alexander Yakovlevich Tairov
 Wonderful Valley (2004) — grandfather Said
 We Are Playing Shakespeare (2004) — Narrator
 Narrow Bridge (2005) — Yakushev
 Hello, We are Your Roof! (2005) — Solomon
 The Shift (2006) — Kharitonov, Academician
 Creation of Love (2006) — Nahum Trakht
 Carrot-Love (2007) — Dr. Kogan
 Carrot-Love 2 (2008) — Dr. Kogan
 Orange Juice (film) (2009) — Leonid, Dasha's father
 Zoya (2010) — Vladimir Rapoport
 The Guardians of the Network (2010) — Sergey Ivanovich Kalgarov
 Boris Godunov (2011) — Pimen
 Fairytale.Is (2011) — Stanislav Dalievich Salvadorov, director of the school
 Last Meeting (2011) — Yuri Vladimirovich Andropov
 Carrot-Love 3 (2011) — Dr. Kogan

Director
 Nameless Star (1978)
 The Pokrovsky Gate (1982)
 If We Believe Lopotukhin... (1983)
 Petersburg Fantasy (1987)
 Visit of a Lady (1989)
 The Shadow, or Maybe all will end Good (1991)
 Four Hands Dinner (1999)
 Joker (2002)
 Playing Shakespeare (documentary) (2004)
 The Charm of Evil (2006)

References

External links 
 
 
 Mikhail Kozakov. Life Line by Russia-K, 2011 (in Russian)

1934 births
2011 deaths
Deaths from lung cancer in Israel
Russian male stage actors
Russian male film actors
Russian theatre directors
Jewish Russian actors
Moscow Art Theatre School alumni
Male actors from Saint Petersburg